From its statehood in 1816 until 1823, Indiana was allocated only one representative, who was elected at-large. During the 43rd Congress, from 1873 to 1875, Indiana elected three of its thirteen representatives to the United States House of Representatives at-large from the entire state.

List of members representing the district 

Indiana admitted December 11, 1816 with one at-large congressional seat.

District inactive since March 4, 1875.

References 

 Congressional Biographical Directory of the United States 1774–present

At-large
Former congressional districts of the United States
At-large United States congressional districts
Constituencies established in 1816
1816 establishments in Indiana
Constituencies disestablished in 1823
1823 disestablishments in Indiana
Constituencies established in 1873
1873 establishments in Indiana
Constituencies disestablished in 1875
1875 disestablishments in Indiana